Mozilla Firefox 4 is a version of the Firefox web browser, released on March 22, 2011. The first beta was made available on July 6, 2010; Release Candidate 2 (a base for the final version) was released on March 18, 2011. It was codenamed Tumucumaque, and was Firefox's last large release cycle. The Mozilla team planned smaller and quicker releases following other browser vendors. The primary goals for this version included improvements in performance, standards support, and user interface.

There was one security update in April 2011 (4.0.1) and version 4 of the browser was made obsolete by the release of Firefox 5 in June 2011.

This marked a transition to giving much less weight to major version numbers, with 5 more major version numbers used by December of that year (5, 6, 7, 8, and 9), compared to 4 in nearly a decade of Firefox development (1, 2, 3, 4).

History

On October 13, 2006, Brendan Eich, Mozilla's Chief Technology Officer, wrote about the plans for "Mozilla 2", referring to the most comprehensive iteration since its creation of the overall platform on which Firefox and other Mozilla products run. Most of these objectives were incorporated into versions 3.0, 3.5, and 3.6. The largest changes, however, were deferred to Firefox 4.0.

In early May 2010, Mozilla's plans for Firefox 4.0 were officially detailed through a blog post by Mike Beltzner, Firefox director.

On May 25, 2011, the Firefox release manager wrote in an email "Firefox 5 will be the security update for Firefox 4," confirming Firefox 4 had entered its "end of life" phase where Mozilla will no longer issue updates. Mozilla continued to issue updates for Firefox 3.6 after 4's EOL declaration. Only one update (4.0.1) was issued for Firefox 4 during its lifetime. Many looking for a copy of this version 4 will be directed to version 6, which cannot run on PowerPC Macintoshes.

Features
Mozilla Firefox 4 includes many new features since version 3.6.

User interface

Firefox 4 brought a new user interface, with a new look designed to make it faster. Early mockups of the new interface on Windows, Mac OS X, and Linux were first made available in July 2009.

New features included improved "doorhanger" notifications, Firefox Panorama (a feature that lets the user visually group tabs), application tabs, a redesigned extension manager, Jetpack extensions support, integration with Firefox Sync, and support for multitouch displays.

Many changes were made to the user interface. By default, tabs were displayed on the top of the window, above the location bar in the area formerly occupied by the window's title bar. The "stop", "reload", and "go" buttons were combined into a single button, placed on the right side of the address bar. The button changed dynamically, based on the current state of the page. 

On Windows Vista and Windows 7, the menu bar is hidden by default with the most common actions moved to a new "Firefox" menu in the upper left-hand corner of the browser. Users can create persistent "app tabs", and customize the tab bar, as well as the bookmark and navigation bars. Many of these features are similar to ones introduced by Google Chrome.

Engine
Firefox 4 is based on the Gecko 2.0 engine, which adds and improves support for HTML5, CSS3, WebM, and WebGL. Also, it includes a new JavaScript engine (JägerMonkey) and better XPCOM APIs.

JägerMonkey is a new JavaScript engine designed to work alongside the TraceMonkey engine introduced with Firefox 3.5. It improves performance by compiling "non-traceable" JavaScript into machine language for faster execution.

Firefox 4 is the first version of Firefox to drop native support of the Gopher protocol; however, continued support is available through an add-on.

Firefox 4 introduces an audio API, which provides a way to programmatically access or create audio data associated with an HTML5 audio element. It allows, for example, to visualize raw sound data, to use filters or to show the audio spectrum.

Firefox 4 no longer relies on the underlying OS for text layout/shaping. Instead, it uses HarfBuzz. This allows for smart OpenType layout/shaping which is consistent across different operating systems.

Performance
Firefox 4 has marked a major change in performance in comparison to former versions 3.6 and 3.5. The browser has made significant progress in Sunspider JavaScript tests as well as improvements in supporting HTML5.

Since Firefox 4.0 Beta 5, hardware acceleration of content is enabled by default on Windows Vista and Windows 7 machines using Direct2D, on OS X using Quartz (basically CPU-only), and Linux using XRender. Hardware acceleration of compositing is enabled by default on Windows XP, Windows Vista and Windows 7 machines using Direct3D, OS X and Linux using OpenGL. Using hardware acceleration allows the browser to tap into the computer's graphics processing unit, lifting the burden from the CPU and speeding up the display of web pages. Acceleration is only enabled for certain graphics hardware and drivers.

One of the performance optimizations was moving all application data into a single file, omni.jar, using a new file format based on the Java Archive format(previous versions used multiple files in the Java Archive format). For later versions the file was renamed omni.ja.

Privacy
Firefox 4 contains support for the "do not track" header, an emerging standard for Web privacy. The header signals the user's request to the web service that any web visitor tracking service be disabled. In the future, this privacy request may become a legal requirement.

It also introduced the ability to delete flash cookies, subjecting them to the same deletion rules as ordinary HTTP cookies.

Development
Nightly builds were marked as 4.0a1pre between February and June 2008, but were renamed to 3.1a1pre afterwards.

Timeline

Reception

On 22 March 2011, and during the 24-hour launch period, Firefox 4 received 7.1 million downloads, as counted and verified by the Mozilla Foundation. Before that date, 3 million people downloaded the second release candidate of the browser, which later became the final version. As a result, the new version of the browser received 10 million downloads on the first day. Notwithstanding, it fell behind the previous record established by the launch of Firefox 3 in 2008, which was 8 million. Second-day downloads for the browser were reported to be 8.75 million, but the lack of an official representative from Guinness to monitor the numbers, made the record attained by Firefox 3 only unofficially been broken.

Usage share

On the official launch date, the usage share for the Firefox 4 was 1.95%, which was 0.34% higher than the previous day according to analytics website StatCounter. As a comparison, the usage share for the Internet Explorer 9 on March 22 was 0.87%, and it was released the prior week, on March 14. A potential factor on Firefox 4's higher usage share is that the latter supports both Windows 2000 and XP, two operating systems Internet Explorer 9 does not support.

Also, at launch, Mozilla prompted existing customers to upgrade their browsers to the newer version, something Microsoft hadn't applied to users of older versions of Internet Explorer. Instead, Microsoft prompted users to upgrade via Windows Update several weeks after launch.

On March 26, 2011, Firefox 4's usage share exceeded that of the 10-year-old and discontinued Internet Explorer 6 for the first time. Also on that date, the browser's usage share was higher than all versions of Safari, Opera and older versions of Firefox with the exception of Firefox 3.6. As a reference, Internet Explorer 9's usage share first exceeded that of Internet Explorer 6 on May 1, 2011 (48 days after release), and Internet Explorer 9 became the second most used version of Internet Explorer for the first time on May 22, 2011 (69 days after release).

According to StatCounter, Firefox 4 reached its usage share peak of 16.7% on June 19, 2011. After that date, it started to decline due to weekly trends and the release of Firefox 5.

Migration issues

Firefox 4 represents a departure in user interface layout and behaviour from previous versions. Users face some issues negotiating these changes, some of which are not documented in the release notes.

Firefox button

The Firefox button groups the menus in Firefox 4. It is displayed by default on the Windows 7 and Windows Vista operating systems. It can be displayed on other operating systems by selecting "Toolbars" from the View menu and unchecking "Menu Bar". The Menu bar can be restored by selecting "Options" from the Firefox button menu and checking "Menu Bar". Certain menu items, such as "Page Info" and "Import" (for importing bookmarks and other browser data), are not available from the Firefox button menu but remain available from the Menu bar. The Menu bar can be displayed temporarily by pressing and releasing the Alt key. Selecting a Menu bar command or pressing the Alt key again dismisses the Menu bar.

Session data

A prompt to save the session (tabs and windows) was presented by default in Firefox 3, with the session restored on the next start if the user selected the "Save & Quit" option. In Firefox 4, all sessions are saved. On the next start, the session is available from the History menu.

This new feature, called on-demand session restore, overwrites the previous session on exit without prompting. The user can check whether there is a saved session at any time by viewing the History menu item "Restore Previous Session". If it is available (not greyed out) there is a restorable session available.

See also

 Firefox early version history

References

External links
 
 Firefox Nightly Builds
 Firefox 4 video decoder architecture
 Rapid Release plans

4.0
2011 software
Free software programmed in C++
FTP clients
History of web browsers
Linux web browsers
MacOS web browsers
POSIX web browsers
Unix Internet software
Windows web browsers
Software that uses XUL

fr:Firefox 4